Pachycephalosaurus (meaning "thick-headed lizard", from Greek pachys-/ "thick", kephale/ "head" and sauros/ "lizard") is a genus of pachycephalosaurid dinosaurs. The type species, P. wyomingensis, is the only known species, but some researchers argue that there might be a second species, P. spinifer. It lived during the Late Cretaceous Period (Maastrichtian stage) of what is now North America. Remains have been excavated in Montana, South Dakota, Wyoming, and Alberta. It was a herbivorous creature which is primarily known from a single skull and a few extremely thick skull roofs, at 22 centimetres (9 inches) thick. More complete fossils have been found in recent years. Pachycephalosaurus was among the last non-avian dinosaurs before the Cretaceous–Paleogene extinction event. The genus Tylosteus has been synonymized with Pachycephalosaurus, as have the genera Stygimoloch and Dracorex in recent studies.

Like other pachycephalosaurids, Pachycephalosaurus was a bipedal herbivore with an extremely thick skull roof. It possessed long hindlimbs and small forelimbs. Pachycephalosaurus is the largest-known pachycephalosaur. The thick skull domes of Pachycephalosaurus and related genera gave rise to the hypothesis that pachycephalosaurs used their skulls in intra-species combat. This hypothesis has been disputed in recent years.

History of discovery
 
Remains attributable to Pachycephalosaurus may have been found as early as the 1850s. As determined by Donald Baird, in 1859 or 1860 Ferdinand Vandeveer Hayden, an early fossil collector in the North American West, collected a bone fragment in the vicinity of the head of the Missouri River, from what is now known to be the Lance Formation in southeastern Montana. This specimen, now ANSP 8568, was described by Joseph Leidy in 1872 as belonging to the dermal armor of a reptile or an armadillo-like animal. It became known as Tylosteus. Its actual nature was not found until Baird studied it again over a century later and identified it as a squamosal (bone from the back of the skull) of Pachycephalosaurus, including a set of bony knobs corresponding to those found on other specimens of Pachycephalosaurus. Because the name Tylosteus predates Pachycephalosaurus, according to the International Code of Zoological Nomenclature Tylosteus would normally be preferred. In 1985, Baird successfully petitioned to have Pachycephalosaurus used instead of Tylosteus because the latter name had not been used for over fifty years, was based on undiagnostic materials, and had poor geographic and stratigraphic information. This may not be the end of the story; Robert Sullivan suggested in 2006 that ANSP 8568 is more like the corresponding bone of Dracorex than that of Pachycephalosaurus. The issue is of uncertain importance, though, if Dracorex actually represents a juvenile Pachycephalosaurus, as has been recently proposed.

In 1890 during the Bone Wars between paleontologists Othniel Charles Marsh and Edward Drinker Cope, one of Marsh's collectors, John Bell Hatcher, collected a partial left squamosal (YPM VP 335) later referred to Stygimoloch spinifer near Lance Creek, Wyoming in the Lance Formation. Marsh described the squamosal along with the dermal armor of Denversaurus as the body armor of Triceratops in 1892, believing that the squamosal was a spike akin to the plates on the Ornithischian Stegosaurus. The squamosal spike was even featured in Charles R. Knight’s painting of Cope’s ceratopsid Agathaumas, likely based on Marsh’s hypothesis. Marsh also named a species of the now-dubious Ankylosaur Palaeoscincus in 1892 based on a single tooth (YPM 4810), also collected by Hatcher from Lance. The tooth was named Palaeoscinus latus, but in 1990, Coombs found the tooth to be from a pachycephalosaurid, possibly even Pachycephalosaurus itself. Hatcher also collected several additional teeth and skull fragments while working for Marsh, though these have yet to be described.

P. wyomingensis, the type and currently only valid species of Pachycephalosaurus, was named by Charles W. Gilmore in 1931. He coined it for the partial skull USNM 12031, from the Lance Formation of Niobrara County, Wyoming. Gilmore assigned his new species to Troodon as T. wyomingensis. At the time, paleontologists thought that Troodon, then known only from teeth, was the same as Stegoceras, which had similar teeth. Accordingly, what are now known as pachycephalosaurids were assigned to the family Troodontidae, a misconception not corrected until 1945, by Charles M. Sternberg.
 
In 1943, Barnum Brown and Erich Maren Schlaikjer, with newer, more complete material, established the genus Pachycephalosaurus. They named two species: Pachycephalosaurus grangeri, the type species of the genus Pachycephalosaurus, and Pachycephalosaurus reinheimeri. P. grangeri was based on AMNH 1696, a nearly complete skull from the Hell Creek Formation of Ekalaka, Carter County, Montana. P. reinheimeri was based on what is now DMNS 469, a dome and a few associated elements from the Lance Formation of Corson County, South Dakota. They also referred the older species "Troodon" wyomingensis to their new genus. Their two newer species have been considered synonymous with P. wyomingensis since 1983.

In 2015, some pachycephalosaurid material and a domed parietal attributable to Pachycephalosaurus were discovered in Scollard Formation, Alberta, Canada, implying dinosaurs of this era were cosmopolitan and didn't have discrete faunal provinces.

Description
The anatomy of Pachycephalosaurus is poorly known, as only skull remains have been described. The dome's rear aspect was edged with bony knobs and short bony spikes projected upwards from the snout. The spikes were probably blunt, not sharp.

The skull was short, and possessed large, rounded eye sockets that faced forward, suggesting that the animal had good eyesight and was capable of binocular vision. Pachycephalosaurus had a small muzzle which ended in a pointed beak. The teeth were tiny, with leaf-shaped crowns. The head was supported by an "S"- or "U"-shaped neck. Younger individuals of Pachycephalosaurus maybe have had flatter skulls, with larger horns projecting from the back of the skull. As the animal grew, the horns shrunk and rounded out, as the dome grew.

Pachycephalosaurus was probably bipedal and was the largest of the pachycephalosaurid ("bone-headed") dinosaurs. Based on other pachycephalosaurids, it probably had a fairly short, thick neck, short fore limbs, a bulky body, long hind legs and a heavy tail, which was likely held rigid by ossified tendons.

Classification
Pachycephalosaurus gives its name to the Pachycephalosauria, a clade of herbivorous ornithischian ("bird hipped") dinosaurs which lived during the Late Cretaceous Period in North America and Asia. Despite their bipedal stance, they were likely more closely related to the ceratopsians than the ornithopods.

Pachycephalosaurus is the most famous member of the Pachycephalosauria (though not the best-preserved member). The clade also includes Stenopelix, Wannanosaurus, Goyocephale, Stegoceras, Homalocephale, Tylocephale, Sphaerotholus and Prenocephale. Within the tribe Pachycephalosaurini, Pachycephalosaurus is most closely related to Alaskacephale. Dracorex and Stygimoloch have been synonymized with Pachycephalosaurus.
 In 2010, Gregory S. Paul proposed that while Stygimoloch and Dracorex possibly represent a juvenile stage of Pachycephalosaurus, Stygimoloch might represent a different species, P. spinifer. This idea has been regarded as a way of interpretation by Mark Witton and Thomas Holtz. A phylogenetic analysis from 2021 by Evans and his colleagues accepted the validity of the genus Stygimoloch on the basis of it being found in later rock layers than Pachycephalosaurus, but agreed with the consensus that Dracorex represents an ontogimorph rather than a distinct taxon. However, David Evans himself noted in his twitter post that he and his colleagues would also consider Stygimoloch as P. spinifer.
Below is a cladogram modified from Evans et al., 2013.

Below is a cladogram from Evans et al., 2021.

Paleobiology

Growth

Aside from Pachycephalosaurus itself, two other pachycephalosaurs were described from the latest Cretaceous of the northwestern United States: Stygimoloch spinifer ("thorny Moloch of the Styx") and Dracorex hogwartsia ("dragon king of Hogwarts"). The former is only known from a juvenile skull with a reduced dome and large spikes, while the latter, also known from only a juvenile skull, had a seemingly flat head with short horns. Due to their unique head ornamentation, they were seen as separate species for a number of years, but in 2007, they were proposed to be juvenile or female morphologies of Pachycephalosaurus. At that year's meeting of the Society of Vertebrate Paleontology, Jack Horner of Montana State University presented evidence, from analysis of the skull of the Dracorex specimen, that it may well be a juvenile form of Stygimoloch. In addition, he presented data that indicates that both Stygimoloch and Dracorex may be juvenile forms of Pachycephalosaurus. Horner and M.B. Goodwin published their findings in 2009, showing that the spike/node and skull dome bones of all three "species" exhibit extreme plasticity and that both Dracorex and Stygimoloch are known only from juvenile specimens while Pachycephalosaurus is known only from adult specimens. These observations, in addition to the fact that all three forms lived in the same time and place, led them to conclude that Dracorex and Stygimoloch were simply juvenile Pachycephalosaurus, which lost spikes and grew domes as they aged. A 2010 study by Nick Longrich and colleagues also supported the hypothesis that all flat-skulled pachycephalosaur species were juveniles of the dome-headed adults, such as Goyocephale and Homalocephale.The discovery of baby skulls assigned to Pachycephalosaurus that were described in 2016 from two different bone beds in the Hell Creek Formation has been presented as further evidence for this hypothesis. The fossils, as described by David Evans and Mark Goodwin et al are identical to all three supposed genera in the placement of the rugose knobs on their skulls, and the unique features of Stygimoloch and Dracorex are thus instead morphologically consistent features on a Pachycephalosaurus growth curve.

It has been noted that morphological differences between Stygimoloch and Pachycephalosaurus may also partly be due to slight stratigraphic differences. The few Stygimoloch specimens that have reliable stratigraphic data were all collected from the upper part of the Hell Creek Formation, whereas Pachycephalosaurus morphs were all collected from the lower part. This has also led to suggestions that Stygimoloch might represent its own species, P. spinifer. In their 2021 redescription of Sinocephale bexelli, Evans and his colleageues treated Stygimoloch (but not Dracorex) as a separate taxon based on their phylogenetic analysis. However, Evans himself has noted that he and his colleagues support the idea of P. spinifer.

Dome function
 
It has been commonly hypothesized that Pachycephalosaurus and its relatives were the bipedal equivalents of bighorn sheep or musk oxen, where male individuals would ram each other headlong, and that they would horizontally straighten their head, neck, and body in order to transmit stress during ramming. However, there have also been alternative suggestions that the pachycephalosaurs could not have used their domes in this way.

The primary argument that has been raised against head-butting is that the skull roof may not have adequately sustained impact associated with ramming, as well as a lack of definitive evidence of scars or other damage on fossilized Pachycephalosaurus skulls (however, more recent analyses have uncovered such damage; see below). Furthermore, the cervical and anterior dorsal vertebrae show that the neck was carried in an "S"- or "U"-shaped curve, rather than a straight orientation, and thus unfit for transmitting stress from direct head-butting. Lastly, the rounded shape of the skull would lessen the contacted surface area during head-butting, resulting in glancing blows.

Alternatively, Pachycephalosaurus and other pachycephalosaurid genera may have engaged in flank-butting during intraspecific combat. In this scenario, an individual may have stood roughly parallel or faced a rival directly, using intimidation displays to cow its rival. If intimidation failed, the Pachycephalosaurus would bend its head downward and to the side, striking the rival pachycephalosaur on its flank. This hypothesis is supported by the relatively broad torso of most pachycephalosaurs, which would have protected vital organs from trauma. The flank-butting theory was first proposed by Sues in 1978, and expanded upon by Ken Carpenter in 1997.

In 2012, a study showed that cranial pathologies in a P. wyomingensis specimen were likely due to agonistic behavior. It was also proposed that similar damage in other pachycephalosaur specimens previously explained as taphonomic artifacts and bone absorptions may instead have been due to such behavior. Peterson et al. (2013) studied cranial pathologies among the Pachycephalosauridae and found that 22% of all domes examined had lesions that are consistent with osteomyelitis, an infection of the bone resulting from penetrating trauma, or trauma to the tissue overlying the skull leading to an infection of the bone tissue. This high rate of pathology lends more support to the hypothesis that pachycephalosaurid domes were employed in intra-specific combat. Pachycephalosaurus wyomingensis specimen BMR P2001.4.5 was observed to have 23 lesions in its frontal bone and P. wyomingensis specimen DMNS 469 was observed to have 5 lesions. The frequency of trauma was comparable across the different genera in the pachycephalosaurid family, despite the fact that these genera vary with respect to the size and architecture of their domes, and fact that they existed during varying geologic periods. These findings were in stark contrast with the results from analysis of the relatively flat-headed pachycephalosaurids, where there was an absence of pathology. This would support the hypothesis that these individuals represent either females or juveniles, where intra-specific combat behavior is not expected.

Histological examination reveals that pachycephalosaurid domes are composed of a unique form of fibrolamellar bone which contains fibroblasts that play a critical role in wound healing, and are capable of rapidly depositing bone during remodeling. Peterson et al. (2013) concluded that taken together, the frequency of lesion distribution and the bone structure of frontoparietal domes, lends strong support to the hypothesis that pachycephalosaurids used their unique cranial structures for agonistic behavior. CT scan comparisons of the skulls of Stegoceras validum, Prenocephale prenes, and several head-striking artiodactyls have also supported pachycephalosaurids as being well-equipped for head-butting.

Diet
Scientists do not yet know what these dinosaurs ate. Having very small, ridged teeth, they could not have chewed tough, fibrous plants like flowering shrubs as effectively as other dinosaurs of the same period. It is assumed that pachycephalosaurs lived on a mixed diet of leaves, seeds, and fruits. The sharp, serrated teeth would have been very effective for shredding plants. It is also suspected that the dinosaur may have included meat in its diet. The most complete fossil jaw shows that it had serrated blade-like front teeth, reminiscent of those of carnivorous theropods.

Paleoecology

Nearly all Pachycephalosaurus fossils have been recovered from the Lance Formation and Hell Creek Formation of the western United States. Pachycephalosaurus possibly coexisted alongside additional pachycephalosaur species of the genera Sphaerotholus, as well as Dracorex and Stygimoloch, though these last two genera may represent juveniles of Pachycephalosaurus itself. Other dinosaurs that shared its time and place include Thescelosaurus, the hadrosaurid Edmontosaurus and a possible species of Parasaurolophus, ceratopsians like Triceratops, Torosaurus, Nedoceratops, Tatankaceratops, and Leptoceratops, the ankylosaurid Ankylosaurus, nodosaurids Denversaurus, and Edmontonia, and the theropods Acheroraptor, Dakotaraptor, Ornithomimus, Struthiomimus, Anzu, Leptorhynchos, Pectinodon, Paronychodon, Richardoestesia, and Tyrannosaurus.

See also
 Timeline of pachycephalosaur research

References

External links
Pachycephalosaurus in the Dinodictionary 
Pachycephalosaurus wyomingensis from National Geographic Online
 TEDx talk by Jack Horner on shape-shifting dinosaur skulls and dinosaur misclassification.

Late Cretaceous dinosaurs of North America
Pachycephalosaurs
Taxa named by Erich Maren Schlaikjer
Fossil taxa described in 1943
Taxa named by Barnum Brown
Lance fauna
Hell Creek fauna
Paleontology in Montana
Paleontology in South Dakota
Paleontology in Wyoming
Maastrichtian genus first appearances
Maastrichtian genus extinctions
Ornithischian genera